Micrurus fulvius, commonly known as the eastern coral snake, common coral snake, American cobra, and more, is a species of highly venomous coral snake in the family Elapidae. The species is endemic to the southeastern United States. It should not be confused with the scarlet snake (Cemophora coccinea) or scarlet kingsnake (Lampropeltis elapsoides), which are harmless mimics. No subspecies are currently recognized.

Description

Males have longer tails than females, but females reach a greater total length.

The dorsal scales are smooth, and are in 15 rows at midbody. The ventral scales number 197–217 in males and 219–233 in females. There are 40–47 subcaudals in males and 30–37 in females. The anal plate is divided.

The color pattern consists of a series of rings that encircle the body: wide red and black rings separated by narrow yellow rings. The head is black from the rostral scale to just behind the eyes. The red rings are usually speckled with black. People who live in its natural range are often taught a folk rhyme as children such as: "Red next to black, safe from attack; red next to yellow, you're a dead fellow," or "Red touching black, friend of Jack; red touching yellow, you're a dead fellow", or simply "red and yellow kill a fellow". These rhymes are useful in teaching children to distinguish king snakes (Lampropeltis ssp.), which are considered helpful predators of vermin such as rats and mice, from the venomous coral snake, which should only be handled by an experienced biologist or herpetologist. However, this rhyme is only applicable to the United States species, and cannot be used reliably in the Caribbean, or Central or South America.

Common names
Among the many common names for M. fulvius are eastern coral snake, American cobra, candy-stick snake, common coral snake, coral adder, Elaps harlequin snake, Florida coral snake, harlequin coral snake, North American coral snake, red bead snake, thunder-and-lightning snake, and, in Spanish, serpiente-coralillo arlequín (literally "harlequin coral snake").

Geographic range

M. fulvius is found in the Southeastern United States from southeastern North Carolina, south through South Carolina and peninsular Florida, and westward through southern Georgia, Alabama and Mississippi to southeastern Louisiana. Coral snakes in Texas, western Louisiana, and southeastern Arkansas are now considered to be a different species, Micrurus tener, which was previously considered a subspecies of M. fulvius.

Habitat
M. fulvius occurs in upland mesophytic and tropical hammocks in Florida, as well as glade land, high pine, scrub oak and live oak hammock, slash pine and wiregrass flatwoods. In southern Georgia and Florida, it is found in dry areas with open ground that are bushy but not heavily vegetated. It is associated with sandy ridges in Mississippi and sandy creek bottoms in Louisiana.
It is rarer in North and South Carolina, but is more typically found there in the scrub oak forests and pitch pine habitats near the coast, as well as the coastal plain of the southeast.

Feeding
M. fulvius eats lizards, birds, frogs, fish, insects, and smaller snakes, including other coral snakes.

Reproduction
Females of M. fulvius are reported to lay three to 12 eggs in June that hatch in September. Males mature 11–16 months after hatching while females mature approximately 26 months after hatching. Adult females are typically larger than males.

Venom
The venom of M. fulvius is a potent neurotoxin with a median  of 1.3 mg/kg SC. Envenomation causes rapid paralysis and respiratory failure in prey. In humans, symptoms include slurred speech, double vision, and muscular paralysis eventually leading to respiratory failure.

M. fulvius bites and fatalities are very rare. Only two documented fatalities were attributed to this species in the 1950s, and only one has been reported since Wyeth antivenin became available for it in the 1960s. The snakes have a mortality rate between 5–20% The most recent fatality attributed to the eastern coral snake occurred in 2006 (confirmed in 2009 report). The victim failed to seek proper medical attention and died several hours after being bitten, becoming the first fatality caused by M. fulvius in over 40 years.

M. fulvius does not account for many cases of snakebite in the U.S., with only about 100 bites each year. The snake is considered secretive and generally reluctant to bite (its venomous potential was still being debated in the 1880s), and envenomation (i.e., secretion of venom during a strike) is thought to occur in only 40% of all bites. Unlike New World pit vipers, this New World coral snake cannot control the amount of primarily neurotoxic venom injected. Dry bites often result from a near miss or deflection; although the venom an adult coral snake holds is enough to kill up to five adults, it cannot release all its venom in a single bite. Historically, however, the mortality rate was estimated to be about 10–20%, with death occurring in as little as one to two hours, or as much as 26 hours after the bite. This is not that surprising, since the LD100 for humans is estimated to be 4–5 mg of dried venom, while the average venom yield is 2–6 mg with a maximum of more than 12 mg. This is probably why current standard hospital procedure in the U.S. is to start with antivenin therapy for coral snake bites, even if no symptoms are found yet.

Wyeth discontinued the manufacture of coral snake antivenin in 2010, citing a lack of profitability. Pfizer has also decided to halt production of its antivenin for similar reasons (see Coral snake antivenom shortage).  Pfizer indicates that antivenom is available and one source states that production has resumed.

References

Further reading
Conant, Roger; Bridges, William (1939). What Snake Is That?: A Field Guide to the Snakes of the United States East of the Rocky Mountains. (With 108 drawings by Edmond Malnate). New York and London: D. Appleton-Century Company. Frontispiece map + viii + 163 pp. + Plates A-C, 1–32. (Micrurus fulvius, pp. 133–135 + Plate 26, figure 76).
Hubbs, Brian; O'Connor, Brendan (2012). A Guide to the Rattlesnakes and other Venomous Serpents of the United States. Tempe, Arizona: Tricolor Books.129 pp. . (Micrurus fulvius, pp. 91–92).
Linnaeus C (1766). Systema naturæ per regna tria naturæ, secundum classes, ordines, genera, species, cum characteribus, differentiis, synonymis, locis. Tomus I. Editio Duodecima, Reformata. Stockholm: L. Salvius. 532 pp. (Coluber fulvius, new species, p. 381). (in Latin).
Morris, Percy A. (1948). Boy's Book of Snakes: How to Recognize and Understand Them. (A volume of the Humanizing Science Series, edited by Jaques Cattell). New York: Ronald Press. viii + 185 pp. (Micrurus fulvius, pp. 117–119, 180).
Schmidt, Karl P.; Davis, D. Dwight (1941). Field Book of Snakes of the United States and Canada. New York: G.P. Putnam's Sons. 365 pp. (Micrurus fulvius, pp. 274–276, Figure 90 + Plate 6).
Smith, Hobart M.; Brodie, Edmund D. Jr. (1982). Reptiles of North America: A Guide to Field Identification. New York: Golden Press. 240 pp.  (paperback),  (hardcover). (Micrurus fulvius, pp. 196–197).
Zim HS, Smith HM (1956). Reptiles and Amphibians: A Guide to Familiar American Species: A Golden Nature Guide. New York: Simon and Schuster. 160 pp. (Micrurus fulvius, pp. 108, 156).

External links

 Accessed 14 December 2020.
Eastern Coral Snake at Herpetology, Florida Museum of Natural History. Accessed 20 December 2006.
Eastern Coral Snake, Micrurus fulvius at Georgia Museum of Natural History. Accessed 20 December 2006.
Coral Snake Micrurus fulvius at Davidson College, Biology Department. Accessed 20 December 2006.
Eastern Coral Snake at Yale Herpetology Page. Accessed 20 December 2006.
Eastern Coral Snake Micrurus fulvius at Snakes of South Carolina and Georgia. Accessed 20 December 2006.

Reptiles described in 1766
Taxa named by Carl Linnaeus
Reptiles of the United States
Fauna of the Southeastern United States
Reptiles of Mexico
fulvius